Khawaled or al-Khawled is a Bedouin village in northern Israel. Located near Nofit, it falls under the jurisdiction of Zevulun Regional Council.

The Israeli Bedouin diplomat Ismail Khaldi initiated a project called "Hike and Learn with Bedouins in the Galilee" that has brought thousands of young Jews to the village, to learn about Bedouin culture and history. He said these encounters inspired him to become a diplomat.

References

Arab villages in Israel
Populated places in Haifa District